Special Edition is the debut studio album by American hip hop group Infamous Mobb. It was released on March 26, 2002 via IM³/Landspeed Records. Recording sessions took place at Chung King Studios, In Ya Ear Studios, Soundtrack Studios, Othaz Recording Studio, D&D Studios, and Battery Studios in New York. Production was handled by The Alchemist, Ax The Bull, Havoc, DJ Muggs, Phil, Ron Gotti, Uno-Dos and V.I.C. It features guest appearances from Mobb Deep, Chinky, Big Noyd, Blitz, Hostyle, Kaos, Ty Maxx, Uno-Dos and V-12. The album peaked at number 118 on the Billboard 200, number 19 on the Top R&B/Hip-Hop Albums, number 5 on the Independent Albums and number 2 on the Heatseekers Albums.

Track listing

Personnel

James "Ty Nitty" Chandler – performer (tracks: 1-6, 8-12, 14, 16)
Jamal "Big Twins"/"Twin Gambino" Abdul Raheem – performer (tracks: 1-5, 8-14, 16)
Lionel "G.O.D. Pt. III" Cooper – performer (tracks: 1-5, 8-12, 14-16)
Fredrick "Hostyle" Ivey – performer (track 3)
Albert "Prodigy" Johnson – performer (tracks: 4, 7, 8), executive producer
TaJuan "Big Noyd" Perry – performer (track 4)
Uno-Dos – performer & producer (track 9)
Blitz – performer (track 9)
Kaos – performer (track 9)
Shalene "Chinky" Evans – performer (tracks: 10, 12, 15)
Shaun "V-12" Walker – performer (track 10)
Kejuan "Havoc" Muchita – performer (track 11), producer (tracks: 11, 16), executive producer
Ty-Maxx – performer (track 14)
Alan "The Alchemist" Maman – producer (tracks: 1, 2, 5, 7, 8, 12-14), executive producer
Ax The Bull – producer (tracks: 3, 16)
Victor "V.I.C." Padilla – producer (track 4)
Phil – producer (track 6)
Ronald "Ron Gotti" Odum – producer (track 10), executive producer
Lawrence "DJ Muggs" Muggerud – producer & mixing (track 15)
Steve Sola – mixing (tracks: 2, 4, 11, 16)
Pablo – mixing (tracks: 3, 5, 6, 10, 16)
Kieran Walsh – mixing (tracks: 8, 9, 12-14)
Trevor "Karma" Gendron – art direction, design
Ola Kudu – artwork
David Corio – photography

Charts

References

External links

2002 albums
Infamous Mobb albums
Albums produced by DJ Muggs
Albums produced by Havoc (musician)
Albums recorded at Chung King Studios
Albums produced by the Alchemist (musician)